O Barqueiro  (also Port of El Barquero) is a parish and a port belonging to the city council of Mañón in Ferrolterra in North-western Spain in the province of A Coruña, in the autonomous community of Galicia.

Industry 

 Important fishing Port.

See also 

 The Ortegal Region North-western Spain.
 The Port of El Barqueiro Municipality of Mañón (Ferrolterra).

Geography of Galicia (Spain)